Beate Slettevoll Lech (born 10 April 1974 in Volda, Møre og Romsdal, Norway) is a Norwegian jazz singer, composer and lyricist in modern jazz and related music, raised in Øvre Årdal, Sogn og Fjordane. She grew up in Volda, Møre og Romsdal as the daughter of the Polish jazz violinist Zdzislaw Lech, known from bands like "Folk & Røvere", Jon Eberson's band Metropolitan (two albums and appearance at Moldejazz 1999), and Beady Belle with her husband jazz bassist Marius Reksjø, and has attracted attention in concerts internationally.

Career 
Lech is a graduate of the University of Oslo and Norges Musikkhøgskole in Oslo. She has collaborated with musicians like Bugge Wesseltoft. On the solo album Min Song Og Hjarteskatt (2011), she show her close relationship to hymns and folk tunes, and her strong desire to make visible female voices in this male dominated arena. With help from lyricists Marit Kaldhol, Hilde Myklebust and Bente Bratlund, and poems from her late grandmother, she presents this lyrical album together with the musicians Marius Reksjø (bass), Erlend Slettevoll (piano), David Wallumrød (keyboards), Knut Aalefjær (drums) and Georg Riedel (double bass).

Under the name Beady Belle, Lech participated in Melodi Grand Prix 2021 and attempted to represent Norway in the Eurovision Song Contest 2021 with the song "Playing With Fire". She did not qualify from Heat 1, and subsequently lost the Second Chance round.

Discography 
Solo album
2011: Min Song Og Hjarteskatt (Kirkelig Kulturverksted)
2014: Høgtidsrom (Kirkelig Kulturverksted), with SKRUK

Within Beady Belle
2001: Home (Jazzland)
2003: Cewbeagappic (Jazzland)
2005: Closer (Jazzland)
2008: Belvedere (Jazzland), includes duets with India Arie Simpson and Jamie Cullum
2010: At Welding Bridge (Jazzland)
2013: Cricklewood Broadway (Jazzland)
2015: Songs From a Decade - The Best of Beady Belle (Jazzland)

Within Metropolitan
1999: Metropolitan (Columbia Records)
2004: Love Is Blind (Curling Legs), with strings

References

External links 
Beady Belle Official Website
Beate S. Lech: Min song og hjarteskatt at Kirkelig Kulturverksted

Norwegian women jazz singers
Norwegian jazz composers
Musicians from Årdal
Musicians from Volda
1974 births
Living people
20th-century Norwegian women singers
20th-century Norwegian singers
21st-century Norwegian women singers
21st-century Norwegian singers